is a city located in Ibaraki Prefecture, Japan. , the city had an estimated population of 84,675 in 35,082 households and a population density of 1437 persons per km2. The percentage of the population aged over 65 was 29.5%.

Geography
Ushiku is located in southern Ibaraki Prefecture, in the low-lying marshy flatlands south of Lake Kasumigaura. It is about 50 kilometers from central Tokyo.

Surrounding municipalities
 Ibaraki Prefecture
 Tsuchiura
 Tsukuba
 Ryūgasaki
 Inashiki
 Ami

Climate
Ushiku has a Humid continental climate (Köppen Cfa) characterized by warm summers and cool winters with light snowfall.  The average annual temperature in Ushiku is 14.0 °C. The average annual rainfall is 1304 mm with September as the wettest month. The temperatures are highest on average in August, at around 25.9 °C, and lowest in January, at around 3.0 °C.

Demographics
Per Japanese census data, the population of Ushiku has grown nearly ninefold over the past 100 years, with especially rapid growth taking place in the late 20th century.

History
The area of Ushiku developed as a castle town around Ushiku Domain, a minor feudal holding under the Tokugawa shogunate in the Edo period. The village of Ushiku was created after the Meiji restoration with the establishment of the modern municipalities system on April 1, 1889. On January 1, 1954 it was elevated to town status and to city status on June 1, 1986.

On January 31, 2020, a magnitude 5.3 earthquake hit 6 kilometres west of the town.  The official time of the earthquake was 17:07:47 (UTC).

Government
Ushiku has a mayor-council form of government with a directly elected mayor and a unicameral city council of 22 members. Ushiku contributes two members to the Ibaraki Prefectural Assembly. In terms of national politics, the city is part of Ibaraki 3rd district of the lower house of the Diet of Japan.

Economy
Ushiku is a local commercial center and has a small industrial park. It is also a bedroom community for Tokyo Metropolis. However, the local economy remains based on agriculture, primarily rice cultivation.

Education
Ushiku has eight public elementary schools and six public middle schools operated by the city government, and two public high schools operated by the Ibaraki Prefectural Board of Education. The city also has one private combined middle/high school.

Transportation

Railway
 JR East – Jōban Line
  -

Highway

Sister city relations
  Hitachiōta, Ibaraki, Japan (1986)
  Shikama, Miyagi, Japan (1988)
  Greve in Chianti, Italy (2013)
  Whitehorse, Yukon, Canada (1985) 
  Orange, New South Wales, Australia (1990)

Local attractions
Ushiku Daibutsu, one of the world's tallest statues
 Chateau Kamiya, a wine chateau started in 1901
 Ushikunuma, a scenic lake that is said to be the birthplace of the mythical kappa beast.
 Higashi Nihon Immigration Center, Japan's largest detention center for the incarceration of immigrants.

Notable people 
Hiroshi Kamiya, voice actor (born in Matsudo, Chiba Prefecture)
Kisenosato, sumo wrestler
Takumi Kobe, professional baseball player
Kiyomi Niwata, Olympic triathlete 
Mineko Nomachi, essayist (born in Hokkaido)
Shigeki Osawa, mixed martial artist

References

External links

Official Website 

Cities in Ibaraki Prefecture